Enderlin can refer to:

 Charles Enderlin (1945– ), French-Israeli journalist
 Karl Enderlin (1923–2004), Swiss figure skater
 Richard Enderlin (1843–1930), musician and United States Army soldier
 Enderlin, North Dakota